Sibylle of Baden (26 April 1485 – 10 July 1518 in Willstätt) was a Margravine of Baden by birth and by marriage, Countess of Hanau-Lichtenberg.  She was a daughter of Margrave Christoph I of Baden and his wife, Countess Ottilie von Katzenelnbogen, the daughter of Philip the Younger of Katzenelnbogen and thus a granddaughter of Philipp I, Count of Katzenelnbogen.

Marriage and Issue
Sibylle married on 24 January 1505 to Count Philipp III of Hanau-Lichtenberg (18 October 1482 – 15 May 1538).  She brought a dowry of 5000 guilders into the marriage. They had six children:
 Johanna (1507 – 27 January 1572 at Eberstein Castle in Gernsbach), married on 6 November 1522 to Count Wilhelm IV of Eberstein (3 May 1497 – 1 July 1562).
 Christophora (1509 – 7 March 1582), a nun in Marienborn Abbey from November 1526, and later the last abbess there.
 Amalie (1512 – 5 February 1578), also a nun in Marienborn Abbey from November 1526.
 Felicitas (5 March 1513 – November 1513).
 Philipp IV (20 October 1514 – 19 February 1590), Count of Hanau-Lichtenberg.
 Felicitas (1516 – 27 August 1551), also a nun in Marienborn Abbey from November 1526.

Altar in Babenhausen

By 1513, Sibylle had given birth to four daughters, but no son. She vowed that she would donate an altar if she had a son. In 1514, Philipp was born and Sibylle donated a high altar to the City Church of St. Nicholas in Babenhausen. This altar is considered a major work of art from the Middle Rhine area in this period (artist unknown). With this artist, Sibylle created a monument to herself and her relatives. The left wing of the altar depicts, among other people, her great-uncle, the blessed Bernard II, who was famous for his pious life and was beatified in the 18th century.

Death
Sibylle died on 10 July 1518 and was buried in the family crypt of the Hanau-Lichtenberg dynasty in the City Church of St. Nicholas in Babenhausen, where her husband was later buried.

Ancestors

References 
 M. Goltzené: Aus der Geschichte des Amtes Buchsweiler, in: Pay d’Alsace, issue 111/112
Karin Lötzsch Ein badischer Markgraf zwischen Heiligen - der selige Bernhard auf dem Altarschrein in Babenhausen, in: Babenhäuser Mosaik = Babenhausen einst und jetzt, vol. 20, Babenhausen, 1990, p. 35-47
 Sebastian Scholz: Die Inschriften der Stadt Darmstadt und des Landkreises Darmstadt-Dieburg und Groß-Gerau = Die deutschen Inschriften, vol. 49., series Mainz vol. 6, edited by the Academy of Sciences at Mainz, 1999
 Reinhard Suchier: Genealogie des Hanauer Grafenhauses, in: Festschrift des Hanauer Geschichtsvereins zu seiner fünfzigjährigen Jubelfeier am 27. August 1894, Hanau, 1894
 Ernst J. Zimmermann: Hanau Stadt und Land, 3rd ed., Hanau, 1919, reprinted 1978

Footnotes 

Margravines of Baden
Countesses
House of Hanau
House of Zähringen
1485 births
1518 deaths
16th-century German people
16th-century German women
Daughters of monarchs